"The Affair" is a 1965 Australian television play based on the novel by C. P. Snow. It starred Roger Climpson, Richard Meikle and Anne Haddy and aired on the ABC as part of Wednesday Theatre.

Australian TV drama was relatively rare at the time.

Plot
A young Cambridge scientist, Donald Howard, introvertive and unpopular, is accused of fraud and dismissed from his fellowship. The twenty fellows attempt to dismiss their feelings of unease by calling him guilty. His wife campaigns for him, splitting the college into two factions, one which sticks by the original verdict the other which seeks to re-try him.

Cast
Richard Meikle as Donald Howard
Brian James as Sir Lewis Eliot
Anne Haddy as Laura Howard
Alexander Archdale
Raymond Westwell as Gibert Dawson-Hill
Roger Climpson
John Brunskill as the master
Ron Haddrick as Skefflington
Richard Parry
Atholl Fleming
Frank Taylor
Charles Tasman
Wendy Playfair
Lou Vernon

Production
The script was based on the Dreyfus Case. The production was filmed at the ABC's studios in Gore Hill, Sydney. It was the third in a trilogy of stories set at Cambridge.

Reception
The Woman's Weekly called it "a milestone in local drama. It was good, world-class TV, not a production that can be tarnished by the tag "good for an Australian one." It was a wonderful play... The cast did well, and the producer did wonders."

The Sydney Morning Herald thought it was "outstandingly cast and intelligently produced" but thought the story had flaws.

References

External links
 
 The Affair at Milesago

1965 television plays
1965 Australian television episodes
1960s Australian television plays
Wednesday Theatre (season 1) episodes